Shellen is a surname. Notable people with the surname include:

Jason Shellen (born 1973), American internet entrepreneur
Stephen Shellen (born 1957), Canadian actor

See also
Shelley (name)